This is a list of candidates for the 2017 Western Australian state election. The election was held on 11 March 2017.

Redistribution and seat changes

A redistribution was completed in 2015. The most significant changes were:
The Liberal-held seats of Alfred Cove and Ocean Reef were renamed Bicton and Burns Beach respectively.
The Labor-held seat of Gosnells was renamed Thornlie.
The Liberal-held seat of Eyre and the National-held seat of Wagin were replaced by the notionally National seat of Roe, while a new notionally Labor seat, Baldivis, was created.
The Labor-held seats of Collie-Preston and West Swan became notionally Liberal.
As a result of the redistribution:
Alfred Cove MLA Dean Nalder (Liberal) contested Bateman, while Bateman MLA Matt Taylor (Liberal) contested Bicton.
Eyre MLA Graham Jacobs (Liberal) contested Roe.
Gosnells MLA Chris Tallentire (Labor) contested Thornlie.
Ocean Reef MLA Albert Jacob (Liberal) contested Burns Beach.
A number of MLCs contested Assembly seats:
Agricultural Nationals MLC Paul Brown contested Geraldton.
East Metropolitan Labor MLC Amber-Jade Sanderson contested Morley.
North Metropolitan Liberal MLC Peter Katsambanis contested Hillarys.

Retiring MPs

Liberal
John Castrilli MLA (Bunbury) – announced 14 March 2016
Kim Hames MLA (Dawesville) – announced 2 August 2014
Liz Behjat MLC (North Metropolitan) – lost preselection
Barry House MLC (South West Region) – announced 27 October 2015

National
Wendy Duncan MLA (Kalgoorlie) – announced 4 December 2015
Terry Waldron MLA (Wagin) – announced 25 November 2014

Legislative Assembly
Incumbent members are shown in bold text. Successful candidates are highlighted in the relevant colour.

Legislative Council

Six candidates were elected in each region. Incumbent members are shown in bold text. Tickets that elected at least one MLC are highlighted in the relevant colour. Successful candidates are identified by an asterisk (*).

Agricultural Region
The Labor Party was defending one seat. The Liberal Party was defending two seats. The National Party was defending two seats. The Shooters, Fishers and Farmers Party was defending one seat.

East Metropolitan Region
The Labor Party was defending three seats. The Liberal Party was defending three seats.

Mining and Pastoral Region
The Labor Party was defending one seat. The Liberal Party was defending two seats. The National Party was defending two seats. The Greens were defending one seat.

North Metropolitan Region
The Labor Party was defending two seats. The Liberal Party was defending four seats.

South Metropolitan Region
The Labor Party was defending two seats. The Liberal Party was defending three seats. The Greens were defending one seat.

South West Region
The Labor Party was defending two seats. The Liberal Party was defending three seats, although sitting MLC Nigel Hallett was running for the Shooters, Fishers and Farmers Party. The National Party was defending one seat.

Notes

References
WA Electoral Commission - 2017 State Election
WA Labor - Candidates
Liberal Party - Your Electorate
Nationals WA - Candidates
The Greens - WA Candidates
One Nation - Candidates

Candidates for Western Australian state elections
2017 elections in Australia